The IWK 250 is a 250-lap late model stock car race held annually at the third-mile Riverside International Speedway in James River, Nova Scotia.

In 2007 the annual 250 mile race at the track was repurposed to raise money and garner support for the IWK Health Centre in Halifax, Nova Scotia. It has since become one of the premier Pro Stock races in North America, attracting national attention, as well as some of the sports top drivers, including NASCAR Champions Brad Keselowski and Matt Crafton, V8 Supercars Champion Marcos Ambrose, and Daytona 500 winner Joey Logano.

Prior to the 2015 IWK 250 the event has raised over $250,000 for the IWK.

History

Early history

The first 250 was an unsanctioned race that took place in 1977 under track promoters Jerry Lawrence and Ron King, the event would be the first 250 lap race in all of Atlantic Canada. Ontario's Billy Watson picked up the win in that first event.

From 1979–1981 the race was won by Don Biederman, who is best known as being the first Canadian driver to run a full season in the NASCAR Grand National Series. The 1981 race was the last event that was not sanctioned by a touring series. The race then took a five-year hiatus from before returning in 1986 under MASCAR sanctioning, with Greg Sewart winning the first race back. John Chisholm sold the track to Eric Vandaalen in 1989.

The 1991 and 1992 editions of the 250, then known as the Riverside 250, were sanctioned by the American Canadian Tour. Both these events were run by another Canadian racing legend, Junior Hanley.

1993 saw the return of MASCAR sanctioning, with Greg Sewart taking his second win overall in the event. MASCAR sanctioning would continue for the remainder of the 1999 races. Scott Fraser dominated the event during this time, winning five consecutive races from 1994–1998.

Following the 1999 running of the 250 the track had fallen into such disrepair that the event was indefinitely cancelled until 2006 when track owner Eric Vandaalen suddenly died and John Chisholm repurchased the track from Vandaalen's estate and completely rebuilt it.

2007 IWK 250

The 2007 IWK 250 was the first event to be run in support of the IWK Health Centre and with that track promoters wanted to have a big name driver headline the event.

NASCAR Hall of Fame inductee Bill Elliott was tapped to be that driver. According to track staff, Riverside paid an extra premium on April 27, 2007 to guarantee his inclusion in the race and heavily promoted his involvement in the race with all the promotional material revolving around Elliott, right down to the design on the tickets. However, just ten days before the race Elliott informed Riverside that he would not be attending via written notice, saying he would be "too busy" to attend, and adding "There is no way I am going to Nova Scotia to race that weekend. Now stop bugging me." This decision by Elliott received a tremendous amount of criticism from fans and media, as it was seen as Elliott bailing on a charity race, with some going as far as encouraging fans to contact Elliott directly to voice their displeasure.

This led to Elliott releasing a formal statement via Motorsports Management International;

The track eventually secured both Regan Smith and Ricky Craven as Elliott's replacement. This would be the last time that Riverside would promote their celebrity driver so heavily in race promotional activities.

Ricky Craven was involved in an early crash with teammate Donald Chisholm, and left the track during the half way break to get a head start home. The event was dominated by veteran racing father and son Mike & Ben Rowe who held off a hard charging Regan Smith to finish 1-2 respectively.

This would mark the only time the podium was dominated by American born drivers, with the Rowe family hailing from Maine, and Smith coming from New York. The next year the race was sanctioned by the Maritime Pro Stock Tour in an attempt to get fans more excited about the local drivers.

2008 IWK 250

The 2008 IWK 250 featured the return of Regan Smith, who finished third the previous year, along with Dale Earnhardt Inc. teammate Aric Almirola as the tracks celebrity drivers. Smith became the first and to date only driver who has competed in NASCAR's national touring series to claim victory in the event, while Almirola finished 7th. Shawn Turple and Mike MacKenzie joined Smith on the podium.

2013 IWK 250

The 2013 running of the IWK 250 attracted their biggest named driver yet when it was announced that defending NASCAR Sprint Cup Series Champion Brad Keselowski made the trip to Nova Scotia to partake in the event. Keselowski brought with him Brad Keselowski Racing development driver Austin Theriault to join him at the event.

Before the race, track owner and philanthropist John Chisholm donated $1 million to support the development of a new state-of-the-art Neonatal Intensive Care Unit (NICU) at the IWK.

Hometown favourite Donald Chisholm had the fastest time in time trials with a time of 14.399 seconds, while Jonathan Hicken won the Dash for Cash, putting him on the pole. Brad Keselowski led 152 laps in the race giving him the Linde Most Laps Led award. Keselowski looked primed to pick up the win until Shawn Tucker laid the bump-and-run with 25 laps remaining, allowing Chisholm to get by as well. That's the way the podium spots stayed until the end, with Kent Vincent finishing fourth and Theriault finishing 5th to round out the top five.

2014 IWK 250

The 2014 IWK 250 was dedicated to John Chisholm, who died just a couple of weeks before the event.

It was announced in June that defending NASCAR Camping World Truck Series Champion Matt Crafton would be entering the event.

Donald Chisholm dominated the race, leading 218 of 250 laps, before John Flemming stole the win, beating Chisholm on a restart with three laps to go. Flemming would become the first driver to win two 250's in the IWK era.

2015 IWK 250

Prior to the 2015 IWK 250 Riverside unveiled the John W. Chisholm Memorial Cup. Past 250 winners such as John Flemming, Rollie MacDonald, Frank Fraser, Wayne Smith and Kent Vincent, along with the Chisholm Family attended the unveiling.

Once against Matt Crafton would be returning to Riverside in a second attempt at the 250, he would be joined by American short track ace Jeff Fultz, who was in Rollie MacDonald's #13.

The race was a controversial one with multiple drivers running up front being black flagged for avoidable contact and jumping the start. Donald Chisholm looked like the favourite, recovering from an early spin to take the lead, Fultz took him out on a restart following a rain delay. Kent Vincent improbably went on to win his second IWK 250 in a thrilling late race battle with rookie D.J. Casey, also receiving the John W. Chisholm Memorial Cup for the first time post race.

Vincent's win was overshadowed however by a post-race confrontation between Fultz and Chisholm's teammate George Koszkulics. Koszkulics followed Fultz around the track for multiple laps and down pit road after the race. The two came to a stop behind the technical inspection shed, where Koszkulics forcibly removed Fultz from his car and landed multiple punches before track security was called to break the pair up.

Race results

References

Stock car races
Motorsport in Canada
Auto races in Canada
Sport in Nova Scotia